

Events
Albertet de Sestaro moves into Lombardy, where he stays until 1221

Births
 Óláfr Þórðarson (died 1259), Icelandic skald
 Philippe de Rémi (died 1265), Old French poet and trouvère

Deaths
 Jean Bodel (born 1165), Old French poet
 Hartmann von Aue (born 1170), German poet of the Middle High German period
 Gottfried von Straßburg (born unknown), a German Minnesänger
 Lu You (born 1125), Chinese Song Dynasty poet

13th-century poetry
Poetry